Greenfield Stadium could refer to:

 Greenfield Stadium (Trelawny), a multi-purpose stadium in Jamaica.
 Greenfield Stadium, Bradford, a former rugby league, greyhound racing and speedway stadium in Bradford, England.
 Greenfields Sports Ground, the home ground of English football team, Market Drayton Town F.C.
 Greenfield International Stadium, a multi-purpose stadium in Thiruvananthapuram, India.